WLST (95.1 FM) is an American commercial radio station licensed to Marinette, Wisconsin broadcasting a country music format.

95.1 FM had been an adult contemporary format (as "The Wave", previously known by the monikers "Live 95" and "Easy Rock 95") station until January, 2008 when then-owner Armada Media swapped formats between WLST and WHYB in Menominee, Michigan. WHYB became "The Wave" while the higher powered WLST took on the "Cat Country" name and format.

Original call letters were WLOT-FM. WLOT was located at 1300 kHz and later became WCJL before going silent in the late 1980s.

External links

LST
Country radio stations in the United States